The 1980 Los Angeles Dodgers finished the season in second place in the Western Division of the National League, one game behind the Houston Astros. After the 162-game regular season, the Dodgers and Astros were tied in first place in the Western Division. The two teams faced off in a 1-game playoff on October 6, 1980 at Dodger Stadium, which the Astros won 7–1 behind a complete-game victory by pitcher Joe Niekro. Don Sutton set a Dodger record with his 52nd career shutout this season and the Dodgers also hosted the All-Star game for the first time.

With the Dodgers joining the cable television trend, games began to be aired on regional cable channel ONTV in the greater Los Angeles area and as a result the TV broadcasting team was expanded. Vin Scully remained the FTA lead broadcaster, with the cable broadcasting team being composed by Geoff Witcher and former Dodger Al Downing.

The last remaining active member of the 1980 Los Angeles Dodgers was Fernando Valenzuela, who played his final MLB game in the 1997 season, although he missed the 1992 season.

Offseason 
 November 17, 1979: Don Stanhouse was signed as a free agent by the Dodgers.
 December 3, 1979: Von Joshua was selected off waivers from the Dodgers by the San Diego Padres.
 March 27, 1980: Johnny Oates was released by the Dodgers.

Regular season

Season standings

Record vs. opponents

Opening Day lineup

Notable transactions 

 July 11, 1980: Charlie Hough was purchased from the Dodgers by the Texas Rangers.
 September 13, 1980: Dennis Lewallyn and cash were traded by the Dodgers to the Texas Rangers for Pepe Frías.

Roster

Player stats

Batting

Starters by position 
Note: Pos = Position; G = Games played; AB = At bats; H = Hits; Avg. = Batting average; HR = Home runs; RBI = Runs batted in

Other batters 
Note: G = Games played; AB = At bats; H = Hits; Avg. = Batting average; HR = Home runs; RBI = Runs batted in

Pitching

Starting pitchers 
Note: G = Games pitched; IP = Innings pitched; W = Wins; L = Losses; ERA = Earned run average; SO = Strikeouts

Other pitchers 
Note: G = Games pitched; IP = Innings pitched; W = Wins; L = Losses; ERA = Earned run average; SO = Strikeouts

Relief pitchers 
Note: G = Games pitched; W = Wins; L = Losses; SV = Saves; ERA = Earned run average; SO = Strikeouts

Game log

|- bgcolor="bbbbbb"
| – || July 8 || 51st All-Star Game || colspan=6 | American League vs. National League (Dodger Stadium, Los Angeles, California)
|-

|-
| Legend:       = Win       = Loss       = PostponementBold = Dodgers team member

Awards and honors 

1980 Major League Baseball All-Star Game
Steve Garvey starter
Davey Lopes starter
Reggie Smith starter
Jerry Reuss reserve
Bob Welch reserve
National League Rookie of the Year
Steve Howe
Comeback Player of the Year Award
Jerry Reuss
Baseball Digest Rookie All-Stars
Steve Howe

Silver Slugger Award
Dusty Baker
TSN National League All-Star
Dusty Baker
NL Pitcher of the Month
Jerry Reuss (June 1980)
NL Player of the Month
Dusty Baker (June 1980)
NL Player of the Week
Don Sutton (Apr. 21–27)
Bob Welch (May 12–18)
Jerry Reuss (June 23–29)

Farm system 

Teams in BOLD won League Championships

Major League Baseball Draft

The Dodgers drafted 36 players in the June draft and 16 in the January draft. Of those, six players would eventually play in the Major Leagues. The Dodgers did not have picks in rounds 2-4 this season as those picks were awarded to other teams as compensation for their signing of free agents.

The first round pick in the June draft was shortstop Ross Jones of the University of Miami. The Dodgers traded him to the New York Mets in 1983 and he would appear in 67 games in parts of three seasons with the Mets and two other teams, hitting only .221.

This was a fairly weak draft class for the Dodgers, with the most notable player being outfielder R. J. Reynolds, who was drafted in the 2nd round of the January draft and played 8 unremarkable seasons as a backup outfielder before finishing up his career in Japan with Nippon Professional Baseball.

Notes

References 
Baseball-Reference season page
Baseball Almanac season page

External links 
1980 Los Angeles Dodgers uniform
Los Angeles Dodgers official web site

Los Angeles Dodgers seasons
Los Angeles Dodgers season
Los